Novosafarovo (Yañı Safar) is a rural locality (a village) in Chishminsky Selsoviet, Chishminsky District, Bashkortostan, Russia. The population was 172 as of 2010. There are 4 streets.

Geography 
Novosafarovo is located 8 km southwest of Chishmy (the district's administrative centre) by road. Chishmy is the nearest rural locality.

References 

Rural localities in Chishminsky District